Aliza Vellani (born October 30, 1991) is a Canadian television actress based in British Columbia. Vellani is most recently known for her role as Rani Singh in the Netflix series, Sweet Tooth. Her other credits include Layla Siddiqui on CBC's series Little Mosque on the Prairie, Marcy in the CW series iZombie and Sandeep in the revival season of the Fox series The X-Files.

Early life and education
Vellani was born in Vancouver to Indian immigrants from East Africa. She began her training at an early age while she attended York House School. In 2007 and 2008, Vellani won the BC and National Istar Awards for Arts and Culture. After high school, Vellani continued her training in acting, voice and dance. Vellani holds a BFA, majoring in Theatre, from Simon Fraser University.

Filmography

Film

Television

References

External links

 
 
 CBC: Little Mosque on the Prairie | Cast - Aliza Velani
 Ismailimail: Interview With Little Mosque on the Prairie’s Aliza Vellani (March 5, 2011)
 Tarlington Training: Alumni - Aliza Vellani
 TSU News: SFU Black Box Information - Cast and Creators (January 29, 2012)

1991 births
Living people
Actresses from Vancouver
Canadian child actresses
Canadian television actresses
Canadian actresses of Indian descent
Canadian people of Gujarati descent
Canadian Ismailis
Khoja Ismailism
Simon Fraser University alumni
21st-century Canadian actresses